The National Assembly is the legislative body of Bahrain. Parliament is bicameral, consisting of the 40 elected members of the Council of Representatives (the lower house) and the 40 royally-appointed members of the Consultative Council (the upper house). The joint session of the National Assembly is chaired by the Speaker of the Council of Representatives, or by the Speaker of the Consultative Council if the former is absent.

Latest election

National Assembly under the 1973 constitution
Under the 1973 Constitution (Article 43), the National Assembly was a single chamber parliament consisting of forty members elected by "universal suffrage". However, the then Amir, Shaikh Isa ibn Salman Al Khalifah decreed that women would not be considered as "universal suffrage" and were not allowed to vote in the 1973 parliamentary elections.

History of the National Assembly of Bahrain

The first ever National Assembly in Bahrain was elected in 1973 under the statutes of the first constitution which was promulgated of that same year. In 1975, the Assembly was dissolved by the then Emir Shaikh Isa ibn Salman al-Khalifa because it refused to pass the government sponsored State Security Law of 1974. The Emir subsequently did not allow the Assembly to meet again or hold elections during his lifetime.

Members of the 1973 National Assembly

After the death of Isa ibn Salman al-Khalifa in 1999, his son Shaikh Hamad ibn Isa al-Khalifah, the new ruler of Bahrain promulgated the Constitution of 2002. That same year elections were held for the Council of Representatives and he appointed the members for the Consultative Council, forming the first National Assembly since 1975.

See also
 Council of Representatives of Bahrain
 Consultative Council of Bahrain
 History of Bahrain
 Politics of Bahrain
 Constitution of Bahrain
 List of legislatures by country

References

External links 
 Council of Representatives
 Consultative Council
 2002 Constitution: Section 3 The Legislative Authority National Assembly
 1973 Constitution: Chapter II Legislative Power

 
1973 establishments in Bahrain
Bahrain
Government of Bahrain
Bahrain